Solaris Center - is a commercial and entertainment complex in Opole, Poland, located on the Copernic Square (pl. Plac Kopernika), next to the University of Opole. The Center was opened on March 4, 2009.

See also
 List of shopping malls in Poland

References

External links 
 J.S.K.
 HSG Facility Management Polska
 BEG Ingeniere Polska

Buildings and structures in Opole
Shopping malls in Poland
Shopping malls established in 2009
Tourist attractions in Opole Voivodeship